Andrew McCarthy (born 20 October 1998) is a Scottish footballer who plays for Peterhead. McCarthy has previously played for Partick Thistle and Queen of the South.

McCarthy started his career with Partick Thistle and debuted in January 2017 in a 4–0 win versus Formartine United in the fourth round of the Scottish Cup. McCarthy started his first Scottish Premiership match in April 2017, in a 1–1 draw versus Celtic at Celtic Park. and was released by the Harry Wraggs at the end of the 2018-19 season.

On 12 July 2019, McCarthy signed a one-year deal with Dumfries club Queen of the South. On 9 January 2020, McCarthy was released early from his contract by Queens due to a lack of first-team football and then signed for Peterhead.

Career statistics

References

1998 births
Living people
Scottish footballers
Scottish Professional Football League players
Partick Thistle F.C. players
Association football midfielders
Place of birth missing (living people)
Queen of the South F.C. players
Peterhead F.C. players